Hamilton E. Holmes, also known as H.E. Holmes, is a metro station in Atlanta, Georgia, the western terminus for the Blue Line in the Metropolitan Atlanta Rapid Transit Authority (MARTA) rail system. This is one of the busiest stations in the MARTA system, handling an average of 22,000 boardings per weekday. When the station opened in 1979 it was originally named Hightower station after Hightower Road (Georgia 280), but both the road and the station were later renamed to honor civil rights movement hero Hamilton E. Holmes.

The station primarily serves areas near the junction of Interstate 20 and Georgia 280 east of Adamsville.

Station layout

Attractions
Frederick Douglass High School
Benjamin E. Mays High School
Six Flags Over Georgia
Greenbriar Mall

Buses at this station
The station is served by the following MARTA bus routes:
 Route 3  - Martin Luther King Jr. Drive / Auburn Avenue
 Route 51 - Joseph E Boone Boulevard.

 Route 66 - Lynhurst Drive / Princeton Lakes
 Route 68 - Benjamin E. Mays Drive.
 Route 73 - Fulton Industrial
 Route 153 - James Jackson Parkway
 Route 165 - Fairburn Road./Barge Road park/ride
 Route 201 - Six Flags Over Georgia
 Route 850 - Carroll Heights / Fairburn Heights
 Route 856 - Baker Hills / Wilson Mill Meadows
 Route 865 - Boulder Park Drive
 Route 867 - Harlan Road / Peyton Forest / Dixie Hills

The station is also served by the following CobbLinc bus routes:
 Route 25 - Hurt Road / Old Alabama Road
 Route 30 - Austell Road / Floyd Road

See also
 Cecil B. Moore station, another train station named after a civil rights leader Cecil B. Moore
 Martin Luther King station, a list of stations named after civil rights leader Martin Luther King Jr.

References

External links

MARTA Station Page
nycsubway.org Atlanta page

Blue Line (MARTA)
Metropolitan Atlanta Rapid Transit Authority stations
Railway stations in the United States opened in 1979
Railway stations in Atlanta
1979 establishments in Georgia (U.S. state)